Homalenotus is a genus of harvestmen in the family Sclerosomatidae from Southern Europe and North Africa.

Species
 Homalenotus armatus (Roewer, 1915)
 Homalenotus buchneri (Schenkel, 1936)
 Homalenotus coriaceus (Simon, 1879)
 Homalenotus graecus Roewer, 1957
 Homalenotus laranderas Grasshof, 1959
 Homalenotus lusitanicus (Kulczynski, 1909)
 Homalenotus machadoi (Rambla, 1968)
 Homalenotus maroccanus Roewer, 1957
 Homalenotus monoceros C.L.Koch, 1839
 Homalenotus oraniense (Lucas, 1847)
 Homalenotus quadridentatus (Cuvier, 1795)
 Homalenotus remyi (Roewer, 1957)
 Homalenotus roeweri Kraus, 1959

References

Harvestmen
Harvestman genera